Andrea di Alessandro was an Italian sculptor of the Renaissance period. He was born in Brescia and active there and in Venice during the latter half of the 16th century. He was a pupil of Alessandro Vittoria, and his masterpiece is the bronze candelabra for the church of Santa Maria della Salute in Venice.

References

 Getty ULAN entry.

Artists from Brescia
Renaissance sculptors
16th-century Italian sculptors
Italian male sculptors
Year of birth unknown
Year of death unknown